Project for Advice, Counselling and Education (PACE) is London's leading charity promoting the health and well-being of lesbian, gay, bisexual and transgender (LGBT) people, through the provision of free or low-cost counselling, therapy, groupwork, advocacy, youthwork, employment and other services.

Youthwork

PACE Youthwork Service caters for lesbian, gay and bisexual young people aged 25 and under.  Service includes three weekly youth groups, and a confidential one to one information and support service.  The youth groups run by PACE are OutZone for young men, Girl Diva for young women, and First Move, a mixed group for those aged 15 and under.

External links
 PACE information via Barnet London borough's website
 The Girl Diva Youth Project website
 The First Move Youth Project website

LGBT health organisations in the United Kingdom
LGBT culture in London
Advice organizations